Matthew occurs (although less commonly than Matthews) as a surname, derived from the given name Matthew.

Notable people with the surname include:
Abish Mathew (1987-Present), Indian talk show host.
Alexander Small Matthew (1884–1969), Scottish-born insurance company manager and political figure in British Columbia
Amenta Matthew (born 1952), Marshallese politician
Andy Matthew (1932–1992), Scottish footballer
Annu Palakunnathu Matthew (born 1964), professor of art (photography) in the University of Rhode Island
Arthur Gordon Matthew CBE DSO (1898–1947), British Royal Artillery officer who served in both World Wars
Brian Matthew (1928–2017), English broadcaster
Catriona Matthew (born 1969), Scottish professional golfer
Christian Matthew (born 1996), American football player
Christopher Matthew (born 1939), British writer and broadcaster
Colin Matthew (1941–1999), British historian and academic
Damian Matthew (born 1970), English football manager and former player
George Frederick Matthew (1837–1923), Canadian botanist and geologist
Henry Matthew (1837–1898), British Anglican colonial bishop
James Matthew, 19th century Scottish footballer
Mervin Matthew (born 1985), member of the West Indies cricket team
Nick Matthew OBE (born 1980), English professional squash player
Patrick Matthew (1790–1874), Scottish grain merchant, fruit farmer, forester, and landowner
Sir Robert Matthew (1906–1975), Scottish architect
Scott Matthew, singer-songwriter born in Queensland, Australia
Thomas Matthew, English merchant and politician who sat in the House of Commons in 1640
Tobias Matthew (1546–1628), archbishop of York, statesman and writer
Sir Tobie Matthew (1577–1655), courtier, diplomat and writer
Wayne Matthew (born 1958), former Australian politician
Wentworth Arthur Matthew (1892–1973), a West Indian immigrant to New York City, founded a Black Hebrew congregation
William Diller Matthew FRS (1871–1930), vertebrate paleontologist who worked primarily on mammal fossils

References

See also 
 Matthew (name)